Prince Frederick William Adolf of Nassau-Siegen (20 February 1680 – 13 February 1722), official titles: Fürst zu Nassau, Graf zu Katzenelnbogen, Vianden, Diez, Limburg und Bronkhorst, Herr zu Beilstein, Stirum, Wisch, Borculo, Lichtenvoorde und Wildenborch, Erbbannerherr des Herzogtums Geldern und der Grafschaft Zutphen, was since 1691 Fürst of Nassau-Siegen, a part of the County of Nassau. He descended from the House of Nassau-Siegen, a cadet branch of the Ottonian Line of the House of Nassau.

Biography
He was baptised in Siegen on 3 March. Among his godfathers were two later kings, namely Elector Frederick III of Brandenburg (later King Frederick I of Prussia) and Prince William III of Orange (later King William III of England). Already on 6 September 1684 Frederick William Adolf became a captain of a company in the Dutch States Army to the repartition of Friesland.

Fürst of Nassau-Siegen
On the death of his father in 1691, Frederick William Adolf succeeded his father as the territorial lord of the Protestant part of the principality of Nassau-Siegen and co-ruler of the city of Siegen. He possessed the district of Siegen (with the exception of seven villages) and the districts of Hilchenbach and Freudenberg. He shared the city of Siegen with his second cousins, John Francis Desideratus (until 1699) and William Hyacinth (since 1699), the Catholic Fürsten of Nassau-Siegen. Because he was still a minor, he was under the guardianship and regency of his mother until 1701. The young prince made several trips to the royal courts of England and France, from where he returned to Siegen as late as 1701.

In 1695, a major city fire destroyed a large part of Siegen, including the Nassauischer Hof, the princely Residenz, and the nearby church. Both buildings were built in 1488 by Count John V of Nassau-Siegen as a Franciscan monastery. The Nassauischer Hof housed, among others, the collection of paintings of the Fürsten of Nassau-Siegen. Numerous valuable paintings by famous artists, including Rembrandt, Peter Paul Rubens and Anthony van Dyck, fell victim to the flames. The nearby  was spared in the fire. The burnt down residence building was not rebuilt. Under the old name, a new three-winged palace was built on the site, and the Fürstengruft was completely incorporated into the corps de logis. The construction of the new palace, which has been called Untere Schloss since the middle of the 18th century, took place between 1695 and 1720. Frederick William Adolf devoted all his energy to governmental affairs and the reconstruction of the city of Siegen and the new palace (for which the plans were still the work of Fürst John Maurice and his Dutch architects Pieter and Maurits Post).

The hospitality of the magistrate of Siegen was always guided by the utmost frugality. When Frederick William Adolf’s father-in-law, Landgrave Frederick II of Hesse-Homburg (who later became known in literature as Prinz Friedrich von Homburg through Heinrich von Kleist) visited the Nassauischer Hof in 1702, he was given the obligatory gift of wine by the city. At an evening reception in the town hall, however, the landgrave had to settle for beer, because – according to the town’s accounts – ‘er seinen Wein bereits erhalten habe’ (‘he already had received his wine’). As a special honour, however, the magistrate had engaged the city pipers from Cologne for the festive reception, who certainly played at the dinner and the ball.

Difficulties with the Catholic Fürst William Hyacinth 
In 1703, the Catholic Fürst William Hyacinth had his part of the city separated from the Reformed part, although the city was actually jointly owned, and at the lower end of Burgstraße he had a wall and a gate constructed, which was always guarded by two picket guards. At the same time, he had a tower built next to the wall enclosing the Hasengarten, which was flattened at the top and on which stood a statue of the Virgin Mary and was therefore popularly known as ‘die platte Merge’ (‘the flat virgin’). The tower was equipped with two cannons aimed at the Residenz of the Reformed princely family in the Nassauischer Hof. Frederick William Adolf repeatedly tried – through the mediation his relatives Fürst William II of Nassau-Dillenburg and Fürst Francis Alexander of Nassau-Hadamar – to reach an amicable settlement with William Hyacinth, but the latter remained unapproachable. His servants dared to assault citizens of Siegen in the streets and in some cases to inflict life-threatening injuries. Therefore, Frederick William Adolf finally requested the intervention of King Frederick I of Prussia in his capacity as member of the Westphalian Circle. Prussian troops then entered Siegen and temporarily (18 January – 24 February 1705) secured the rights of the population. During this period, the citizens destroyed ‘die platte Merge’.

William Hyacinth, who stayed with the Emperor in Vienna at the beginning of 1705 and hoped in vain to win him over, experienced many changes on his return. Suddenly he intensified the pressure in the religious domain. Complaints about this and about the unbearable burden of the tax rate, as well as about completely nonsensical regulations which paralysed economic life in Siegerland, finally led the Aulic Council to order the Electoral Palatinate to investigate the conditions in Nassau-Siegen. On 15 July 1706, Palatinate-Neuburgian dragoons suddenly entered Siegen, together with a detachment of Prussian troops and 500 men of the Ausschuß of the Duchy of Berg. They did not leave the city until 24 July, after various military measures to end harrowing injustices.

When on 29 March 1707 William Hyacinth had the innocent citizen Friedrich Flender beheaded without trial or conviction, the complaints of the Catholic population to the Aulic Council became so urgent that the latter ordered the cathedral chapter in Cologne to investigate the abuses in the Catholic part of Nassau-Siegen. The subjects of William Hyacinth were particularly annoyed by an edict proclaimed on 8 November 1706, according to which anyone who had a fortune and could pay the taxes but did not, had to have their heads cut off. The Friedrich Flender case had shown that William Hyacinth was indeed serious about carrying out such threats.

On 20 April 1707 representatives of the cathedral chapter in Cologne appeared in Siegen with an armed contingent and occupied . William Hyacinth fled headlong, first to Burbach, then via Hadamar to Limburg an der Lahn. There he invited William II of Nassau-Dillenburg and Francis Alexander of Nassau-Hadamar and pointed out to them what it could mean if a Nassau area were to fall permanently under the administration of the Archdiocese of Cologne. The cohesion within the House of Nassau was so great that the relatives even promised their support to such an incompetent man as William Hyacinth in order to regain governmental power.

The next year and a half, William Hyacinth stayed in Regensburg. His attempts at the Imperial Diet achieved nothing. Furthermore, at that time he also tried to sell the Catholic principality of Nassau-Siegen. He offered it to Frederick I of Prussia, but the latter did not even consider it because he knew that such a sale would be against the Nassau house laws. Willem Hyacinth also offered it to his Protestant second cousin Frederick William Adolf. The latter did not accept the offer because everyone could foresee that the Catholic line of Nassau-Siegen sooner or later would become extinct without male heirs and that the part of the land would fall to the Protestant relatives anyway.

In October 1712 Frederick William Adolf and William Hyacinth reached an agreement about their share in the city of Siegen. William Hyacinth ceded the Catholic land to Frederick William Adolf in exchange for an annual pension of 12,000 Reichsthalers. There was even an intention to marry off Maria Anna Josepha, William Hyacinth’s underage daughter, to the even younger reformed Hereditary Prince Frederick William. All this was done not in the least to get rid of the troublesome foreign administration.

Partial inheritance of Nassau-Hadamar
On the death of Fürst Francis Alexander of Nassau-Hadamar in 1711, when the House of Nassau-Hadamar became extinct in the male line, Frederick William Adolf inherited the Principality of Nassau-Hadamar together with the Fürsten William Hyacinth of Nassau-Siegen, William II of Nassau-Dillenburg and John William Friso of Nassau-Diez. When the principality of Nassau-Hadamar was divided in 1717, Frederick William Adolf and William Hyacinth of Nassau-Siegen acquired the city of Hadamar, Dehrn and Niederzeuzheim. These territories represented one third of the inheritance. As they belonged to both William Hyacinth and Frederick William Adolf, Frederick William Adolf therefore owned only one-sixth of Nassau-Hadamar.

Death, burial and succession

Frederick William Adolf died of dropsy in the Nassauischer Hof in Siegen on 13 February 1722. He was buried on 10 April in the Fürstengruft there. He was succeeded by his son Frederick William II, who was under the guardianship and regency of his stepmother until 1727.

When, during the renovation of the Fürstengruft in 1951, the marble slabs that had been placed in front of the niches in 1893 had to be reattached, it was possible to take a look inside the graves. It was discovered that many graves had already been opened. Behind the slabs were walls of field-baked bricks, some of which were loose and allowed a view into the interior of the niches. In the light of a strong flashlight one could see that in the niche of Frederick William Adolf, at the foot of the very well preserved coffin, there is a box of about 60x40x40 cm, made of zinc or lead.

Marriages and issue

First marriage
Frederick William Adolf married at Homburg Castle on 7 January 1702 to Landgravine Elisabeth Juliana Francisca of Hesse-Homburg (Homburg Castle, 6 January 1681 – Nassauischer Hof, Siegen, 12 November 1707), the fifth daughter of Landgrave Frederick II of Hesse-Homburg and his second wife Duchess Louise Elisabeth of Courland.

From the marriage of Frederick William Adolf and Elisabeth Juliana Francisca the following children were born:
 Charlotte Frederica (Siegen, 30 November 1702 – Stadthagen, 22 July 1785), married:
 in Weimar on 27 June 1725 to Fürst Leopold of Anhalt-Köthen (Köthen, 29 November 1694Jul. – Köthen, 19 November 1728).
 in Varel on 26 April 1730 to Count Albrecht Wolfgang of Schaumburg-Lippe-Bückeburg (Bückeburg, 27 April 1699 – Bückeburg, 24 September 1748).
 Sophia Mary (Nassauischer Hof, Siegen, 28 January 1704 – Nassauischer Hof, Siegen, 28 August 1704).
 Sibylle Henriette Eleonore (Nassauischer Hof, Siegen, 21 September 1705 – Nassauischer Hof, Siegen, 5 September 1712).
 Fürst Frederick William II (Nassauischer Hof, Siegen, 11 November 1706 – Nassauischer Hof, Siegen, 2 March 1734), succeeded his father in 1722. Married at Ludwigseck Hunting Lodge near  on 23 September 1728 to Countess Sophie Polyxena Concordia of Sayn-Wittgenstein-Hohenstein (Berlin, 28 May 1709 – , Siegen, 15 December 1781).
 Sophia Elizabeth (Nassauischer Hof, Siegen, 7 November 1707 – Nassauischer Hof, Siegen, 5 October 1708).

Second marriage

From the marriage of Frederick William Adolf and Amalie Louise the following children were born:
 Sophia Wilhelmine Adolphina (Nassauischer Hof, Siegen, 28 February 1709 – Nassauischer Hof, Siegen, 16 December 1710).
 Charles Frederick (Nassauischer Hof, Siegen, 4 March 1710 – Nassauischer Hof, Siegen, 25 December 1710).
 Wilhelmine Charlotte Louise (Nassauischer Hof, Siegen, 25 April 1711 – Untere Schloss, Siegen, 7 March 1771).
 Augusta Amelie (Siegen, 9 September 1712 – Wittgenstein Castle, Laasphe, 22 February 1742), married in Siegen on 6 May 1738 to Count Frederick of Sayn-Wittgenstein-Hohenstein (Berlin, 29 January 1708 – 9 June 1756). He later remarried the youngest sister of Augusta Amelie.
 Louis Ferdinand (Nassauischer Hof, Siegen, 29 March 1714 – Nassauischer Hof, Siegen, 26 February 1715).
 Caroline Amelie Adolphina (Siegen, 26 November 1715 – Laubach, 10 August 1752), married at Wittgenstein Castle in Laasphe on 11 February 1751 to Count Christian August of Solms-Laubach (Wetzlar, 1 August 1714 – Laubach, 20 February 1784).
 William Maurice (Nassauischer Hof, Siegen, 1 March 1717 – Nassauischer Hof, Siegen, 5 August 1719).
 Elizabeth Hedwig (Siegen, 19 April 1719 – Wittgenstein Castle, Laasphe, 10 January 1789), married in Siegen on 12 June 1743 to Count Frederick of Sayn-Wittgenstein-Hohenstein (Berlin, 29 January 1708 – 9 June 1756). He was the widower of an older sister of Elisabeth Hedwig.

Ancestors

Notes

References

Sources
 
 
 
 
 
 
 
 
 
 
 
 
 
 
 
 
 
  (2004). "Die Fürstengruft zu Siegen und die darin von 1669 bis 1781 erfolgten Beisetzungen". In:  u.a. (Redaktion), Siegener Beiträge. Jahrbuch für regionale Geschichte (in German). Vol. 9. Siegen: Geschichtswerkstatt Siegen – Arbeitskreis für Regionalgeschichte e.V. p. 183–202.
 
 
 
  (1882). Het vorstenhuis Oranje-Nassau. Van de vroegste tijden tot heden (in Dutch). Leiden: A.W. Sijthoff/Utrecht: J.L. Beijers.

External links

 Friedrich Wilhelm I Adolf Fürst zu Nassau-Siegen. In: The Peerage, by Darryl Lundy.
 Nassau. In: Medieval Lands. A prosopography of medieval European noble and royal families, compiled by Charles Cawley.
 Nassau Part 5. In: An Online Gotha, by Paul Theroff.

|-

1680 births
1722 deaths
German Calvinist and Reformed Christians
German military officers
Frederick William Adolf of Nassau-Siegen
Frederick William Adolf of Nassau-Siegen
People from Siegen
17th-century German people
18th-century German people